The Ministry of Foreign Affairs and Trade (MFAT) (Māori: Manatū Aorere) is the public service department of New Zealand charged with advising the government on foreign and trade policy, and promoting New Zealand's interests in trade and international relations.

History
The Ministry of Foreign Affairs and Trade (MFAT) was first established as the Department of External Affairs (NZDEA) on 11 June 1943 through an Act of Parliament. This decision was prompted by a need for New Zealand to conduct its own external relations and because New Zealand's neighbour Australia already had its own Department of External Affairs since 1921. Prior to that, New Zealand's interests had been represented overseas by the United Kingdom. The establishment of the External Affairs Department was accompanied by the creation of a foreign service and the establishment of diplomatic missions in the United States, Canada, Australia, and the Soviet Union between 1942 and 1944. Like its similarly named Australian and Canadian counterparts, the NZDEA was named "External Affairs" rather than "Foreign Affairs" in deference to the British Government’s responsibility for conducting foreign policy on behalf of the British Empire and later the Commonwealth of Nations.

From 1969 to 1988, the Ministry was known as the Ministry of Foreign Affairs (MFA). Between 1988 and 1993, the Ministry was renamed the Ministry of External Relations and Trade (MERT). The NZDEA and the MFA was administrated by the Prime Minister's Department until 1975. Between 1946 and 1975, the Secretary of External/Foreign Affairs also served concurrently as the Permanent Head of the Prime Minister's Department. For much of this period, several New Zealand Prime Ministers including Peter Fraser, Walter Nash, and Keith Holyoake held the External Affairs portfolio. MFAT had no relation to an earlier Department of External Affairs, which was responsible for administrating New Zealand's South Pacific island dependencies of Niue, the Cook Islands, Tokelau, and Samoa between 1919 and 1943. In 1943, that aforementioned Department was renamed the Department of Island Territories. In 1975, the Island Territories Department was dissolved and its functions were absorbed back into the Ministry of Foreign Affairs.

Functions
The ministry represents New Zealand interests to other governments, including at the United Nations, APEC, TPPA and the WTO. It takes an active role in the Asia-Pacific region, and has been involved in regional security initiatives such as the RAMSI intervention in the Solomon Islands, and negotiating and implementing a peace agreement in Bougainville. It is active in developing export opportunities for local companies, and in 2008 negotiated a free trade agreement with China.

It used to sponsor the Centre for Strategic Studies New Zealand in conjunction with other NZ Government ministries, though the Centre is now part of Victoria University of Wellington.

NZAID

The New Zealand overseas development aid agency New Zealand Agency for International Development (NZAID) was a semi-autonomous agency within the ministry, until it was brought back into the ministry as the International Development Group (IDG). It is a major provider of aid to the Pacific.

Ministers

The Ministry serves 4 portfolios, 4 ministers and an associate minister.

Organisational structure
The Ministry has 653 staff based in Wellington and 661 staff overseas, with consulates and embassies in 53 posts worldwide.

Secretaries of Foreign Affairs and Trade
Sir Alister McIntosh (1942–1966)
Sir George Laking (1967–1972)
Frank Corner (1973–1980)
Merwyn Norrish (1980–1988)
Graham Ansell (1989–1993)
Richard Nottage (1993–1998)
Neil Walter (1999-2002)
Simon Murdoch (2002–2009)
John Allen (2009–2014)
Brook Barrington (2015–2019)
Chris Seed (2019–present)

See also
Foreign relations of New Zealand
List of diplomatic missions of New Zealand
List of Ambassadors and High Commissioners to and from New Zealand as of 24 July 2006
List of high commissioners of New Zealand to the United Kingdom

References

Further reading
An eye, an ear and a voice: 50 years in New Zealand’s external relations edited by Malcolm Templeton (1993, Ministry of Foreign Affairs and Trade, Wellington NZ) 
Undiplomatic Dialogue: Letters between Carl Berendsen and Alister McIntosh 1943-1952 edited by Ian McGibbon (1993, Auckland University Press, Auckland NZ) 
Unofficial Channels: Letters between Alister McIntosh and Foss Shanahan, George Laking and Frank Corner 1946-1966 edited by Ian McGibbon (1999, Victoria University Press, Wellington NZ)

External links

NZ Embassy finder

Foreign relations of New Zealand
New Zealand
Foreign Affairs and Trade, Ministry of